Allium anisopodium, also called thread-leaf chive, is a plant species native to Siberia, the Russian Far East, Korea, Kazakhstan, Mongolia, and northern China.

Allium anisopodium is a perennial herb with a scape (round in cross-section) up to 70 cm tall. Leaves are about the same length as the scape. Flowers are purple.

Varieties
Two varieties are generally recognized:

Allium anisopodium var. anisopodium    --- Leaves, scape and pedicels smooth

Allium anisopodium var. zimmermannianum (Gilg) F.T. Wang & T. Tan  (syn: Allium zimmermannianum Gilg) --- Leaves, scape and pedicels with a rough surface

References

anisopodium
Onions
Flora of China
Flora of Korea
Flora of Russia
Flora of Siberia
Flora of Mongolia
Flora of Inner Mongolia
Flora of Kazakhstan
Plants described in 1852
Flora of Altai (region)
Flora of Amur Oblast